Mufti Ajmal Khan is a Pakistani politician who had been a member of the National Assembly of Pakistan from 2008 to 2013.

Political career
He ran for the seat of the National Assembly of Pakistan from Constituency NA-15 (Karak) as an independent candidate in 2002 Pakistani general election but was unsuccessful. He received 9,443 votes and lost the seat to Shah Abdul Aziz, a candidate of Muttahida Majlis-e-Amal (MMA).

He was elected to the National Assembly from Constituency NA-15 (Karak) as a candidate of MMA in 2008 Pakistani general election. He received 28,665 votes and defeated Shams ur Rehman Khattak, a candidate of Pakistan Muslim League (N) (PML-N). During his tenure as Member of the National Assembly, he served as Parliamentary Secretary for Planning and Development.

References

People from Karak District
Pakistani MNAs 2008–2013
Living people
Year of birth missing (living people)